American Hot Wax is a 1978 biographical film directed by Floyd Mutrux with a screenplay by John Kaye from a story by John Kaye and Art Linson. The film tells the story of pioneering disc jockey Alan Freed, who in the 1950s helped introduce and popularize rock and roll, and is often credited with coining the term "rock 'n' roll". The film starred Tim McIntire, Fran Drescher, Jay Leno, Laraine Newman, Jeff Altman, and Moosie Drier. It also featured musical performances by Chuck Berry, Jerry Lee Lewis, Frankie Ford, Screamin' Jay Hawkins, and Brooklyn Dreams as "Professor La Plano and The Planotones". The film was not a box-office success.
  
A&M Records released a two-record soundtrack album featuring the film's live Brooklyn Paramount performances on record one (in stereo) and the film's soundtrack (the original monophonic hit recordings) on record two. The LP reached number 31 on the Billboard charts.

Producer Art Linson discusses the movie's production and failure at the box office in his book What Just Happened? Bitter Hollywood Tales from the Front Line.

Plot
In late-1950s New York City, WROL disc jockey Alan Freed (Tim McIntire) promotes his upcoming rock n' roll show at the Brooklyn Paramount Theater, headlined by Chuck Berry and Jerry Lee Lewis. Freed's radio program is hugely popular with teenagers, and the Paramount show is expected to sell out, despite concern that the police will shut it down as they did with Freed's previous show in Boston. Local law enforcement, led by D.A. Coleman (John Lehne), targets Freed for allegedly inciting teenagers to wild and immoral behavior by broadcasting raucous and sexually suggestive rock n' roll songs, many of them by black musicians. WROL station management also dislike Freed's unconventional programming habits, including playing songs that the station has banned such as "Tutti Frutti" by Little Richard. Freed nevertheless rejects all suggestions that he change his programming style and feature more socially acceptable musical acts, such as Pat Boone. He also refuses to sign a statement declaring that he never accepted anything in return for playing a record, on the grounds that signing it would be a lie and that all disc jockeys, including those who have signed the statement, take such bribes.

Because Freed has the power to make a record a hit by playing it on his show, he is constantly besieged by record promoters and artist managers.  He avoids most of these people, but takes an interest in those who share his love for rock n' roll. He repeatedly rebuffs the aggressive record promoter Lennie Richfield (Jeff Altman), but is kind to Artie Moress (Moosie Drier), a young boy who is the president of a Buddy Holly fan club, and even puts Artie on the air to talk about his idol Holly. Freed also encourages Louise (Laraine Newman), a white teenage songwriter whose parents ignore her talent and disapprove of her associating with the Chesterfields, a black doo-wop group who perform her songs. Freed himself suffers discrimination when he takes a racially mixed group of teenagers with him to look at a luxury home he wants to buy; the owner refuses to sell to him at any price. Freed's own father back in Akron, Ohio also rejects him, returning a check Freed sent him and refusing to talk on the telephone with his son.

The Paramount show goes on despite Coleman's attempts to stop it, including a failed attempt at a drug bust. Louise is moved to tears after the Chesterfields, a late addition to the show, perform her songs to thunderous applause from the capacity crowd. Freed's feisty young secretary Sheryl (Fran Drescher) and his chauffeur Mookie (Jay Leno), who have constantly bickered on the job, finally bond over their shared love of Freed and rock n' roll, and begin a romance. Mid-show, IRS agents appear and seize all the proceeds from the box office, leaving Freed with no money to pay his artists. However, Chuck Berry saves the day by doing Freed the favor of performing for free. Jerry Lee Lewis, who initially had said he was not coming, then arrives at the last minute and closes the show as the police try to shut it down because teenagers are "dancing in the aisles". As the police begin clearing the theater with Lewis still performing onstage, chaos breaks out and the film abruptly ends, with an epilogue stating that this was Freed's last performance, and that he was taken off the air, indicted, moved to California, and died five years later, penniless, but that rock n' roll lives on.

Cast
 Tim McIntire—Alan Freed
 Fran Drescher—Sheryl
 Jay Leno—Mookie (Michael)
 Laraine Newman—Teenaged Louise
 Moosie Drier—Artie Moress
 Jeff Altman—Lennie Richfield
 John Lehne—D.A. Coleman
 Richard Perry—Record producer

Performers
 Chuck Berry—Himself
 Jerry Lee Lewis—Himself
 Screamin' Jay Hawkins—Himself
 Frankie Ford—Himself
 Charles Greene—Chuck Otis

The Chesterfields
 Carl Earl Weaver
 Al Chalk
 Sam Harkness
 Arnold McCuller

The Delights
 Stephanie Spruill
 Joyce King
 Yolanda Howard
 Brenda Russell

Timmy and The Tulips (erroneously shown as "Timmy and The Tangerines" in the end credits)
 Charles Irwin—Timmy
 Jeanne Sheffield
 Jo Ann Harris

The Planotones
 Kenny Vance—Professor La Plano
 Joe Esposito
 Bruce Sudano
 Ed Hokenson

Reception
The film was a box-office bomb. However, head of Paramount Michael Eisner loved the movie and saw it nearly a dozen times. Critic Pauline Kael praised the performances and approvingly called the film "a super B-movie" and "trashily enjoyable". Janet Maslin of The New York Times wrote that "'American Hot Wax,' which has a plot so thin you could thread a needle with it, chooses to see the era strictly in terms of the B-movie melodramas it produced." Arthur D. Murphy of Variety called the film "unpretentious and enjoyable." Gene Siskel gave the film three stars out of four and wrote, "At its worst, 'Hot Wax' comes off as a 92-minute, 'blasts-from-the-past,' TV record offer ... At its best, the film does manage to suggest some of the frenzied innocence of rock's early days, before rock became a multibillion-dollar industry." Kevin Thomas of the Los Angeles Times found the film "enjoyable and at times poignant", although he noted the film seemed "evasive" on the issue of "Freed's involvement with payola (a word, incidentally, never heard in the film)."  Gary Arnold of The Washington Post wrote, "Director Floyd Mutrux and screenwriter John Kaye evidently fail to perceive that the liveliest elements in their movie contradict their admiring view of Freed as a pop-culture hero and martyr ... the filmmakers insist on looking at their subject matter through rose-colored glasses."

Charts

References

External links
 
 
 
 
 

1978 films
1970s biographical films
American biographical films
American rock music films
Biographical films about radio people
1970s English-language films
Films directed by Floyd Mutrux
Films produced by Art Linson
Films set in 1959
Films set in New York City
Paramount Pictures films
1970s American films